Dhour El Choueir, sometimes Dhour Shweir, is a mountain town in Lebanon ('dhour' meaning 'summit, top [of a mountain]') located in the Matn District. It lies slightly north of the main Beirut - Damascus highway, overlooking the city of Beirut and the Mediterranean sea, some 30 km from Beirut and 42 km from Beirut International Airport in Khalde. This mountain town is one of Mount Lebanon's favored summer resorts, known for its extraordinary fresh air and is also important for its August yearly carnival, honoring Lebanon's emigrants. It is linked to Beirut via the Matn Express Highway, also known as the M90 through Baabdat.

Demographics
The inhabitants of Dhour El-Choueir are predominantly Christians, with half of the population being Eastern Orthodox, while the other half is mostly Melkite and Maronite.

History
The Greek Catholic monk Abdallah Zakher set up an Arabic language printing press using movable type at the monastery of Saint John at Choueir, the first homemade press in Lebanon. He personally cut the type molds and did the founding of the elegant typeface. He created the first true Arabic script type in the Middle East. The first book off the Zakhir press was printed in 1734; this press continued to be used until 1899.

The town was on the front line during the Lebanese Civil War from 1975 to 1990.

Education
Dhour Shweir Public Secondary School

Notable people
Antun Saadeh, the founder and historical leader of the Syrian Social Nationalist Party (SSNP) 
Tanios Bou-Nader Khneisser, the father of the Sword & Shield Folkloric Dance.
 Jafet/Yafeth family (Naameh, Chedid, Benjamin Yafeth) family of local aristocracy who immigrated to Brazil towards the end of the 19th century and became business tycoons of that country. 
Abraham Rihbany (1869-1944), a writer on politics and religion.
Khalil Hawi (1919-1982) was one of the most famous Lebanese poets of the 20th century.
Asad Rustum (4 June 1897 - 23 June 1965) a Lebanese historian, academic and writer.
Salwa Nassar (1913 — February 17, 1967) was a Lebanese nuclear physicist and college administrator
The family of Edward Said (1935-2003) regularly vacationed in the resort, and Said was married there (1962).

See also
Souk El Gharb
Lebanese Civil War
Mountain War (Lebanon)
People's Liberation Army (Lebanon)

References

External links
Home page of Shweir
  Choueir - Ain Es Sindianeh, Localiban

Populated places in the Matn District
Eastern Orthodox Christian communities in Lebanon
Melkite Christian communities in Lebanon
Maronite Christian communities in Lebanon